Formally known as the Price Statistics Review Committee, the Stigler Commission was convened in 1961 to study the measurement of inflation in the United States.  Headed by economist George Stigler, its mandate was to conduct research into all types of price indices, including the Consumer Price Index (CPI).  Based on its recommendations, the Bureau of Labor Statistics established a price research division.

The next major commission like it was the Boskin Commission in 1996, which was solely focused on evaluating the CPI.

Economy of the United States
1961 establishments in the United States
1961 in economics